Marianne Viermyr (born 14 January 1947 in Oslo) is a Norwegian children's author. She debuted as an author in 1976 and has written full-time since 1988. She won the Damm Prize in 1989 for Sviktet. She lived in the Østfold for 18 years before she settled in Bærum in 1989.

Works
 Kråkebollen - Aschehoug 1976
 Anne opp og Anne ned - Eide. 1987
 Det hemmelige rommet -Eide. 1988
 Sviktet - Ungdomsbok Damm. 1989
 Sin egen fange - Gyldendal. 1989
 Gjøkungen - Gyldendal. 1991
 En fløyte full av toner  - Billedbok Damm. (medforfatter) 1992
 Tro på det umulige! - Gyldendal. 1993
 Dragens Dør - Gyldendal. 1994
 Fløy en liten blåfugl - og en grønn. - Gyldendal. 1995
 Hysj-hysj! - Damm. 1998
 Hjerte-smerte -  Damm. 2000
 Jungel - rim og regler -  Damm. 2000
 Blodig alvor -  - Damm 2002
 Bølla Britt og lille meg -  - Damm 2003
 Tusenkunstneren Thorbjørn Egner -  - Damm 2003
 Bølla Britt og Rita Rapp -  Damm 2006
 Fy katte!  - Cappelen 2006

References

Norwegian children's writers
1947 births
Living people
Writers from Oslo
20th-century Norwegian women writers
21st-century Norwegian women writers
Norwegian women children's writers